, (born  (same reading) on April 6, 1979, married name unknown) is a Japanese pop singer-songwriter from Osaka Prefecture and raised in Nabari, Mie. She first become known after her appearance on the Japanese talent show Asayan in the late 1990s, becoming the first member of the future "Hello! Project". Heike currently goes by the simply Michiyo.

History

Pre-debut
Heike applied  while attending Mie Prefectural Nabari Nishi Senior High School as a junior. The audition for their first singer produced by Sharam Q was held from April through August 1997, by a former Japanese talent show Asayan on the TV Tokyo network, which was later broadcast. Out of around 9,900 applicants, she was eventually chosen as the winner of the audition by Sharm Q under the initiative of their leader Hatake. Michiyo, however, was "sealed" or seclude herself from media for training until her debut under the direction of Tsunku of Sharam Q. During this two-month seclusion time, Tsunku gave a chance to five of 10 runners up to begin their own group, named as Morning Musume. After all, while Tsunku had been producing the repechage team, Hatake had been producing Heike. Her stage name was determined as  changing the Kanji characters for her first name into hiragana in October 1997.

1997: Debut and "Get"
Heike's debut single "Get", composed by Hatake, with lyrics by Tsunku, was released from the WEA Japan label on November 5, 1997. "Get" was her highest-charting single, peaking at number 24 on the Oricon Singles Chart, charting for six weeks. On November 6, her first live performance was held at the Nippon Budokan Hall in front of an audience of ten thousand invited by Asayan. Michiyo Heike and Morning Musume shared a joint fan club, known as "Hello!", later to become known as "Hello! Project". During this time, Heike was the only soloist.

1998: "Sotsugyō —Top of the World—", "Daikirai", Morning Cop "Daite Hold on Me!", and "Dakedo aishi sugite"
In February 1998, she released her 2nd single, "Sotsugyō —Top of the World—", a cover song for The Carpenters' Top of the World. The lyrics of the song was written by Makoto of Sharm Q, peaking at number 35 on the Oricon Singles Chart. Michiyo released her first studio album Teenage Dream on March 25, 1998, peaking at number 50 on the Oricon Albums Chart. "Daikirai" was released for Michiyo's third single on July 1, 1998. The song was again composed by Hatake, peaking at number 50 on the Oricon Singles Chart. Morning Cop "Daite Hold on Me!" OST was released on September 30, 1998, under the names of Michiyo Heike and Morning Musume, peaking at number 18 on the Oricon Albums Chart. "Dakedo aishi sugite" was released Michiyo's fourth single from the joint OST album Morning Cop "Daite Hold on Me!" on October 25, 1998, peaking at number 95 on the Oricon Singles Chart.

1999: "Anata no yume ni naritai" and "Scene"
Heike's 5th single "Anata no yume ni naritai" was released on February 10, 1999, peaking at number 70 on the Oricon Singles Chart. She released her 6th single "Scene" on July 28, 1999. The song was again composed by Hatake, with lyrics by Michiyo herself, peaking at number 79 on the Oricon Singles Chart.

2000: "One-room natsu no koi monogatari", For Ourself, and "Ai no chikara"
Michiyo released her 7th single "One-room natsu no koi monogatari" on May 17, 2000. The song was her first song produced by Tsunku, peaking at number 26 on the Oricon Singles Chart. "Ai no chikara" was her 8th single released on August 9, 2000. The song was again produced by Tsunku, peaking at number 38 on the Oricon Singles Chart. Heike released her 2nd studio album For Ourself —Single History— on September 13, 2000, peaking at number 23 on the Oricon Singles Chart. In 2000, Heike participated in shuffle unit Kiiro 5.

2001: "Kekkyoku Bye Bye Bye" and "Propose"
Heike released her 9th single "Kekkyoku Bye Bye Bye" on February 7, 2001, peaking at number 45 on the Oricon Singles Chart. She then signed a new recording contract with zetima label after her recording contract with WEA Japan was terminated. Her 10th single "Propose" was released on November 7, 2001, peaking at number 31 on the Oricon Singles Chart. In 2001, she was part of 7-nin Matsuri.

2002: "Murasaki shikibu"
"Murasaki shikibu", released on June 5, 2001, was her last single as a Hello! Project member, peaking at number 39 on the Oricon Singles Chart. In July 2002, she was a member of Sexy 8. Since Heike's management contract with Up Front Group was terminated, she "graduated from" Hello! Project in November 2002, five years after her debut.

2004–present
Her first indie album, titled Jecica, was entirely self-written and was released on March 3, 2004.

Discography

Singles

As Michiyo Heike

As Michiyo

Albums

As Michiyo Heike

As Michiyo

DVD

Performances

Radio

Films

Musicals

Concert tours

References

External links
Official site 
Official Ameba Blog 

1979 births
Living people
Hello! Project solo singers
Japanese idols
Japanese women pop singers
Japanese television personalities
Musicians from Mie Prefecture
Musicians from Osaka Prefecture
Singing talent show winners